Faith and Health: Psychological Perspectives is a book of scientific psychology on the relationship between religious faith and health. Edited by Thomas G. Plante and Allen C. Sherman, the book was published in the United States in 2001.

The book includes 16 chapters divided among four major parts that focus on general population outcomes (such as impacts on longevity), outcomes in special populations such as medical patients or adolescents, clinical implications, and overall criticisms and reflections.

Faith and Health has been reviewed in several professional journals, including Contemporary Psychology,<ref
 name=richards03/>
Journal of Nervous and Mental Disease,<ref
 name=boehnlein02/>
and others.<ref
 name=king02/><ref
 name=martin02/>

Topics Covered
Faith and Health contains 16 chapters written by various psychological or biomedical researchers, and some of them are notable. Chapter titles and authors are listed in the table (below, at right). After an introductory chapter, the remaining 15 chapters are divided into four major parts.

The book's first part focuses on the faith/health relation in the general population. Chapter 2 by Carl E. Thoresen and his colleagues describes the existing empirical evidence, and discusses many methodological issues. The authors view the evidence as indicating that religious/spiritual factors "appear to be associated with physical, mental, and overall health, but the lack of adequate controls and designs in many studies has seriously limited our understanding of these relationships." The authors also note methodological challenges related to the need for more studies that follow participants over time, rather than observing them only once; the need to recognize that if religion and spirituality operate through other factors, they may be very influential but remain unrecognized, because they do not explain unique variance; and the need for more experimental studies. The authors also present a "working model... that tries to capture several factors that may be involved in the pathways connecting [religious/spiritual] factors with health," and highlight four studies<ref
 name=hummer99></ref><ref
 name=musick04></ref><ref
 name=oman98></ref><ref
 name=strawbridge97></ref> that investigated religion/spirituality and health relationships using "state-of-the-art epidemiological designs"

In chapter 3, Michael McCullough reviewed evidence for relations between religious involvement and mortality. McCullough describes results of a meta-analysis of 42 independent estimates of the association between religious involvement and length of life, reporting that "religious people had, on average, 29% higher odds of survival during any follow-up period than did less religious people" Other chapters looked at religion and health in late adulthood, and at the role of forgiveness and unforgiveness. A final chapter discussed how religiousness and spirituality is assessed in health research.

The second part focuses on faith and health in special populations. These include adolescents who are at risk for abusing tobacco and alcohol, as well as those with cancer or HIV/AIDS. The section also discusses how religious faith is related to mental health outcomes, such as well-being, depression, anxiety, substance abuse, eating disorders, schizophrenia, and bipolar disorders. It concluded that "Most research examining the relationship between religion and spirituality and mental health outcomes shows positive associations."

Part three addresses implications of the faith/health relationships for the clinic. Chapters discuss implications for psychotherapy, rehabilitation medicine. A chapter by Tan and Dong offers dangers and guidelines for implementing spiritually-informed interventions that may include components such as meditation, forgiveness, prayer, solitude, the laying on of hands, fellowship, and worship, observing that "as health care providers implement religiously or spiritually oriented interventions, it is crucial that they do so with the utmost ethical caution and professional care."

The fourth part contains commentaries on the previous chapters and on the literature. Timothy Smith wrote that "it is clear that matters of religion and spirituality are relevant to each of the foci of health psychology... [and] the emergence of this topic [of faith and health] seems long overdue." He also cautioned that many results are "preliminary."
A chapter by Richard Sloan and his colleagues argued that no compelling evidence links religion and health, and that "concerns of patients about religion and health are best addressed by clergy, to whom referrals can readily be made." A concluding chapter by the editors argued that

The book also contains a 14-page index.

Reviews and influence
Reviews have appeared in Contemporary Psychology, the Journal of Nervous and Mental Disease,<ref
 name=boehnlein02></ref> Families, Systems, & Health,<ref
 name=king02></ref> and the Journal of Health Psychology.<ref
 name=martin02></ref>

In Contemporary Psychology, Richards and O'Grady wrote that "Faith and Health takes us well beyond Freud's, Watson's, Skinner's, and Ellis's oversimplified, negative views of religion and spirituality... [and] sets a high standard of methodological rigor, openness, and balance."

In the Journal of Nervous and Mental Disease, Boehnlein wrote that the editors' "primary focus, and stated goal, is to assess what is known about the relationship between health outcomes and faith [and they] are largely successful in achieving this goal. " He also wrote that because it reviews so much quantitative research, the book is geared more towards researchers than towards clinicians, although there are a few chapters devoted to psychotherapy and rehabilitation.

In Families, Systems, & Health, King wrote that their "numerous publications" attest to the editors' expertise in faith/health relations, and that the book is a "comprehensive look at research." He wrote that he found "the book very useful
and will use it in both my practice and teaching... I plan to add a section on couples and health to my couples therapy class—an omission I recognized upon reading this informative book."

In the Journal of Health Psychology, Martin wrote that the book was "an unusually cohesive
collection of chapters that reviews current research endeavors, recent findings and critical controversies in this rapidly changing field," and would make a "very nice text for a graduate-level seminar." Three "admirable" strengths include representative contributions by top researchers, a section on clinical application, and two solid methodological critiques that "lay out a framework for addressing problems that, left dormant, would fatally harm the discipline." Martin stated that one weakness was a lack of clear delineation of how definitions of spirituality and religion in particular chapters "overlap (or fail to) with similar definitions" of the constructs in other chapters. Another weakness was a lack of large-scale theoretical frameworks, although two chapters (2 and 5) provide "insightful discussion and examples of how [theoretical modeling] might be approached."

The published book also contained praise for the book by Norman Anderson, Kenneth I. Pargament, David M. Wulff, and Peter Salovey.<ref name=backcover>Back cover (dust jacket) of Faith and Health.</ref>

See alsoHandbook of Religion and HealthContemplative Practices in ActionMultidimensional Measurement of Religiousness/Spirituality for Use in Health Research''

References

2001 non-fiction books
American non-fiction books
Books about health
Books about religion
Psychology books